Lukian Araújo de Almeida or simply Lukian (born September 21, 1991) is a Brazilian footballer who plays as a striker for Avispa Fukuoka.

Career 
He joined K League Challenge side Bucheon FC in July 2015.

References

External links

1991 births
Living people
Footballers from Rio de Janeiro (city)
Brazilian footballers
Association football forwards
Brazilian expatriate footballers
Nova Iguaçu Futebol Clube players
Rio Branco Esporte Clube players
Luverdense Esporte Clube players
Bucheon FC 1995 players
K League 2 players
Expatriate footballers in South Korea
Brazilian expatriate sportspeople in South Korea
Expatriate footballers in Thailand
Brazilian expatriate sportspeople in Thailand
Expatriate footballers in Japan
Brazilian expatriate sportspeople in Japan
Busan IPark players
FC Anyang players
Lukian Araujo de Almeida
Lukian Araujo de Almeida
Lukian Araujo de Almeida
Júbilo Iwata players
Avispa Fukuoka players
J1 League players
J2 League players